In the Temple of Venus is a 1948 German drama film directed by Hans H. Zerlett and starring Olga Tschechowa, Willy Birgel, and Hermann Speelmans. The film was originally produced during the final stages of the Second World War in 1945, but was not given a release until three years later.

The film's sets were designed by the art directors Franz Bi and Bruno Lutz. It was shot at the Bavaria Studios in Munich.

Cast

See also
 Überläufer

References

Bibliography

External links 
 

1948 films
1948 drama films
German drama films
1940s German-language films
Films directed by Hans H. Zerlett
Bavaria Film films
Films shot at Bavaria Studios
German black-and-white films
1940s German films